MV Hjaltland is a NorthLink Ferries vehicle and passenger ferry based in Aberdeen. She operates daily ferry services between mainland Scotland and the northern archipelagos of Orkney and Shetland.

History
MV Hjaltland and her sister ship, were constructed in 2002 at Aker Finnyards in Finland.

Layout
MV Hjaltland carries passengers, cars, freight and livestock. There are a choice of restaurants, bars and lounges, children's play area and a cinema. The restaurants and lounges have a total seating capacity of 600. The original 100 cabins had a total of 300 beds. All cabins are en-suite, most being two berth, with a number of four-berth cabins for families. In April 2007, an additional accommodation module was fitted in Birkenhead, increasing her capacity to 356 berths. The ship is fitted with lifts and was built to accommodate disabled passengers throughout. There are 10 officer and 28 crew cabins.

Each pair of diesel engines drives a controllable-pitch propeller through a gearbox. There are two rudders, two 900 kW bow thrusters and two Mitsubishi stabilisers.

Service
MV Hjaltland operates between Lerwick and Aberdeen, with a call at Kirkwall on some days. A walkway, built specifically for the current vessels, can take both foot and car passengers. She is also able to relieve on the Stromness to Scrabster crossing.

Incidents and accidents

The ferry was later used to transport the bodies of three of the crash victims to Aberdeen.

On 9 September 2013, a passenger went missing from the boat during a sailing from Lerwick to Aberdeen. No body was ever recovered despite a major air and sea search.

Footnotes

External links
 NorthLink Ferries - Official Website

NorthLink Ferries
2002 ships
Ships built in Rauma, Finland
Transport in Shetland